Mejbil Jwayed  (born in Basra) is a former Iraqi football forward who played for Iraq in 1973 Palestine Cup of Nations.

Jwayed played for Al-Mashat, Al-Baladiyat and Al-Ittihad, he is considered the owner of the first goal in the history of the Iraqi Premier League, as he scored it for Al-Baladiyat against Al-Rafidain in the 1974–75 season.

References

Iraqi footballers
Iraq international footballers
Association football forwards
Al-Ittihad SC players
People from Basra Province
People from Basra
Sportspeople from Basra